The 1969 South African Open – Men's singles was an event of the 1969 South African Open tennis tournament and was played on outdoor hard courts at Ellis Park in Johannesburg, South Africa from 1 April until 12 April 1969. The draw consisted of 96 players and was played in a best-of-five sets format. Tom Okker was the reigning singles champion. Rod Laver won the singles title by defeating Tom Okker in the final, 6–3, 10–8, 6–3.

Draw

Finals

Top half

Section 1

Section 2

Section 3

Section 4

Bottom half

Section 5

Section 6

Section 7

Section 8

References

External links
 ITF tournament edition details

South African Open (tennis)
1969 in South African tennis
April 1969 sports events in Africa